The 2016 East Tennessee State Buccaneers football team represented East Tennessee State University (ETSU) in the 2016 NCAA Division I FCS football season and were in the first year of their second stint as football members of the Southern Conference (SoCon). ETSU had originally joined the SoCon in 1978, with football joining in 1979, but dropped the sport after the 2003 season and left the conference entirely in 2005. ETSU returned to the SoCon as a full but non-football member in 2014, at that time announcing that the school would reinstate football with play beginning in the 2015 season. The Buccaneers played that season as an FCS independent.

They were led by second-year head coach Carl Torbush and played all but one of their home games at Kermit Tipton Stadium. The other home game, the Buccaneers' first SoCon game since 2003, was held at the nearby Bristol Motor Speedway on September 17. The game was played on a temporary grass surface that will be laid down from the Tennessee–Virginia Tech game to be held one week earlier. They finished the season 5–6, 2–6 in SoCon play to finish in seventh place.

Schedule

Game summaries

at Kennesaw State

vs. Western Carolina

at Wofford

Chattanooga

at VMI

Furman

West Virginia Wesleyan

at The Citadel

at Mercer

Cumberland

Samford

References

East Tennessee State
East Tennessee State Buccaneers football seasons
East Tennessee State Buccaneers football